Bulbophyllum coloratum (colored bulbophyllum) is a species of orchid in the genus Bulbophyllum. Found in New Guinea in the coastal plains under 500 meters in elevation. It is a small sized leaf that blooms on a single flowered inflorescence.

References

The Bulbophyllum-Checklist
The Internet Orchid Species Photo Encyclopedia

coloratum